The Monongalia Arts Center, or MAC, is located in Morgantown, West Virginia near the campus of West Virginia University.  The MAC opened to the public in 1978 as a non-profit arts and culture center, which it remains today.  The MAC's mission is "to provide a home for the arts where the work of visual and performing artists is showcased and interest in the arts is nurtured through ongoing educational programs." The building hosts two galleries, a theatre for the performing arts, and is undergoing production on other projects, including an Internet radio station and the establishment of the Tanner Theatre as a regular venue for touring bands. The building is also recognized on the National Register of Historic Places.

History

The neoclassical building that houses the Monongalia Arts Center was constructed in 1913 and federally owned until it was purchased in September 1975 by the Louis F. Tanner family.  It was designed by Oscar Wenderoth in Classical Revival style.  The building served historically as a post office, and it was known as Old Morgantown Post Office.

Mabel Tanner, founder of the Morgantown Players and local art critic for over 40 years, had long since envisioned "a facility complete with theatre, art gallery, exhibit area, classrooms and workshop space, that would house the performing and creative arts and provide a central point from which to foster the arts and encourage their growth." After her death in 1974, her family purchased the building and then established the Monongalia County Arts Association, Inc. in 1976 to begin work upon a community arts center, thus giving birth to Tanner's reverie.

In 1978, after two years of planning and development, the Mon. County Arts Association officially opened the MAC to the public.

In 1979, the MAC was added to the National Register of Historic Places as "Old Morgantown Post Office". It is located in the Downtown Morgantown Historic District, listed in 1996.

Departments

Benedum Gallery
The Benedum Gallery, made possible through funding from the Claude Worthington Benedum Foundation, was established in 1979. Located on the first floor of the MAC, the gallery displays monthly art exhibits from a variety of cultural and artistic backgrounds. The gallery is handicap-accessible and open during weekdays and Saturday afternoons. Information on each month's gallery is available on location or online at the center's website.

Robert M. Davis Gallery

The Robert M. Davis Gallery is MAC's second-floor gallery. This gallery was created out of a grass roots effort in 2004 as means to showcase emerging artists and cutting edge art forms. In 2007 and 2008 the Davis Gallery experiences several significant upgrades and was doubled in size due to a grant from the Hazel Ruby McQuain Charitable Trust and community volunteer efforts.

Mabel DeVries Tanner Theatre
The Mabel DeVries Tanner Theatre was dedicated in 1981, and the room serves as MAC's space for the performing arts. Over the years, the theatre has hosted everything from plays and classic theatre productions to avant-noise music performances. The theatre also functions as a multipurpose space, available to the public for reservations for events such as wedding receptions and other private parties. In 2008, the MAC began regularly booking local and touring bands for shows and concerts in the space.

Classes
The MAC offers classes and workshops in a variety of fields, including classes in Zumba, yoga, and Kindermusik. The center also hosts two free sewing circles, Sew What?! and MACKnitters.  On going artists studio sessions for figure drawing are offered all year featuring multiple models and body types.  MAC offers the most affordable private music and art lessons in the region as well.  Another ongoing program is MAC Improv which meets every Tuesday from 7-9 PM.

See also 
List of United States post offices

References 

Buildings and structures in Morgantown, West Virginia
Arts centers in West Virginia
Museums established in 1978
Theatres in West Virginia
Contemporary art galleries in the United States
Neoclassical architecture in West Virginia
Government buildings completed in 1913
Post office buildings on the National Register of Historic Places in West Virginia
Education in Monongalia County, West Virginia
Tourist attractions in Monongalia County, West Virginia
National Register of Historic Places in Monongalia County, West Virginia
Individually listed contributing properties to historic districts on the National Register in West Virginia
1978 establishments in West Virginia
Performing arts centers in West Virginia